James May's Man Lab is a British television series presented by former Top Gear presenter James May. The first, three-part series was aired on BBC Two between 31 October and 14 November 2010. The second, five-part series was aired between 25 October and 18 December 2011. Repeats of Series 2 continued on late night BBC One with signing for the deaf throughout January 2012.

Series 3 began broadcasting in March 2013, after James May's other co-hosted TV show (Top Gear) finished Series 19. Series One was released on DVD on 7 November 2011 by Acorn Media UK, followed by Series Two on 8 October 2012.

Premise 
The series explores traditional skills that are being lost by the modern man, and shows how to stop them from being lost forever. Each episode has a variety of themed tasks, including construction, seduction, destruction and more. If science, geometry, maths, logic and explosives can be used in these tasks, so much the better. Tasks include sending a dead pet's ashes into space using a homemade hydrogen balloon, creating one's own smelting furnace, constructing a pool table, felling a tree using explosives, escaping from Dartmoor prison whilst avoiding detection from expert trackers and making a magnetic ceiling panel to throw your keys at so you don't lose them.

The first series also had a celebrity man task, where a celebrity attempted to beat a personal best at a certain 'man task', such as changing a tyre; however, this aspect was not continued into series two. The theme tune was written by May himself and is often played live over the end credits by a variety of different performers, including barber shop quartet, bagpipes and more.

Series overview

Episodes

Series one (2010)

Series two (2011)

Series three (2013) 
On 9 July 2012, May announced on his Facebook page that filming had started on the third series. In January 2013, May announced via his Twitter that Man Lab was due to air in March, after the next series of Top Gear had finished. The series began at 8pm on 28 March 2013.

International 
James May's Man Lab was broadcast on BBC America in the U.S., where it is periodically rebroadcast.  It has also been broadcast in Australia on SBS One. However, SBS stopped showing series three after just two episodes in June 2013. In New Zealand it used to air on TV3 for first 2 seasons. From series 3 it will now air on Prime.

Home media 
Series One was released on DVD by Acorn Media UK on 7 November 2011. Series Two was released on 8 October 2012.

References

External links 
 
 
 

Man Lab
2010 British television series debuts
2013 British television series endings
BBC high definition shows
BBC television documentaries
Documentary television series about technology
English-language television shows